Lapplandsender was a World War II military radio station for Nazi German forces in Northern Finland and Northern Norway. The transmitter was in the German garrison area outside the provincial capital of Rovaniemi in the Arctic Circle. The station was under command of Propagandakompanie 680, which was one of the propaganda units of the Wehrmacht, the German army.

Lapplandsender broadcast entertainment, news and propaganda daily from December 1941. In October 1944, during their retreat from Lapland, the Germans took the station down and moved it to Bergen in Western Norway. Shortly afterwards, Rovaniemi was burned to the ground during the course of the Battle of Rovaniemi.

See also
Nazi propaganda

External links
http://www.stellamaris.no/konigs.htm
http://www.lexikon-der-wehrmacht.de/Gliederungen/Propaganda/Propaganda-R.htm Propagandakompanie 680
Finnish Broadcasting company archives files General Dietl's eulogy 1944

Nazi propaganda organizations
Military history of Germany during World War II
Eastern European theatre of World War II
Lapland (Finland)
History of the Arctic
Continuation War